Depressaria ivinskisi is a moth in the family Depressariidae. It was described by Alexandr L. Lvovsky in 1990. It is found in the Gissar Range of Central Asia.

References

Moths described in 1990
Depressaria
Moths of Asia